Debendranath Tagore (15 May 1817 – 19 January 1905) was an Indian philosopher and religious reformer, active in the Brahmo Samaj (earlier called Bhramho Sabha) ("Society of Brahma", also translated as Society of God). He joined Brahmo samaj in 1842. He was the founder in 1848 of the Brahmo religion, which today is synonymous with Brahmoism. Born in Shilaidaha, his father was the industrialist Dwarkanath Tagore; he himself had 14 children, many of whom, including Nobel-prize winning poet Rabindranath Tagore, made significant artistic or literary contributions to society.

Thakur Bari (House of Tagores)
Debendranath Tagore was born to the Tagore family in Jorasanko, popularly known as Jorasanko Thakur Bari in North-western Kolkata, which was later converted into a campus of the Rabindra Bharati University. The Tagore family, with over three hundred years of history, has been one of the leading families of Calcutta, and is regarded as a key influence during the Bengal Renaissance. The family has produced several persons who have contributed substantially in the fields of business, social and religious reformation, literature, art and music.

Education and work 
Debendranath studied at home from 1823-25. In 1827, he was admitted to the Anglo Hindu College established by Raja Rammohan Roy. After studying there for some time, he started looking after his father's property and business, as well as philosophy and religion. When his grandfather died in 1838, he had a mental change. He became interested in religion and started studying various subjects including Mahabharata, Upanishads and Eastern-Western philosophy. As a result, he developed a desire for spirituality. He established the "Tattwaranjani Sabha" (1839), which was later renamed as the Tattwabodhini Sabha. At this time he published a Bengali translation of the Katha Upanishad (1840).

In 1842, Debendranath took charge of the Tattwabodhini Sabha and the Brahmo Samaj. The following year, the Tattwabodhini Magazine was published in his own money under the editorship of Akshay Kumar Datta. In this newspaper, the Upanishads were published with Debendranath's scholarship and Bengali translation. With the efforts of Debendranath, the public meetings were started on the Vedas. In 1844, Debendranath introduced the first method of Brahmopasana and from the following year it was used in the Brahmo Samaj. As a result of his long study of scriptures, he realized that it was not possible to lay the foundation of Brahmanism on the Upanishads alone. So from 1848 onwards, he gradually started publishing a translation of the Rig Veda in the Tattwabodhini magazine, which was published in a library called Brahmodharma (1869). In 1850, another of his books, Atmattvavidya, was published. In 1853, he was appointed secretary of the Tattwabodhini Sabha and in 1859 established the Brahma Vidyalaya.

Debendranath stopped the puja-parvanadi and introduced festivals like 'Magh Utsav', 'New Year', 'Diksha Din' etc. In 1867, he bought a large piece of land called Bhubandanga in Birbhum and established an ashram. This ashram is today's famous Santiniketan. He was also one of the founders of the Bethune Society of the Hindu Charitable Institution.

Debendranath was actively involved in politics for some time. When the British Indian Association was established on 31 October 1851, he was appointed its secretary. He tried his best to waive the chowkidari tax of the poor villagers and sent a letter to the British Parliament demanding India's autonomy. Debendranath was enthusiastic about the practice of widow marriage, but was opposed to child marriage and polygamy. He also made a special contribution to the spread of education. In 1867, Radhakanta Dev conferred on him the title of 'Protector of National Religion' and 'Maharshi' by the Brahmo Samaj to protect the Indian youth from the influence of Christianity.

Books
 Brahma Dharmo Grantho (1851)
 Atmatatto Bdya (1852)
 Brahma Dharmer Mot O Biswas (1860)
 Kalikata Bramha Samajer Baktrita (1862)
 Gyan O Dharmer Unnati (1893)
 Porolo O Mukti (1895)

References

External links 
  
 Debendranath Tagore at Encyclopædia Britannica
 Debendranath Tagore at Banglapedia 

1817 births
1905 deaths
Bengali Hindus
20th-century Bengalis
19th-century Bengalis
Bengali writers
19th-century Hindu philosophers and theologians
Brahmos
Bengali zamindars
Founders of new religious movements
Indian social reformers
Indian social workers
19th-century Indian philosophers
Indian reformers
Hindu revivalists
Indian theologians
Indian autobiographers
People associated with Santiniketan
Debendranath
Social workers from West Bengal
Indian male writers
Indian non-fiction writers
19th-century Indian writers
19th-century Indian male writers
19th-century Indian non-fiction writers
Indian spiritual writers
Indian religious writers
Indian scholars
19th-century Indian scholars